Miss Colombia 2010 was the 58th edition of the Miss Colombia pageant. It was held on November 15, 2010 in Cartagena, Colombia.

At the end of the event, Natalia Navarro of Bolívar crowned Catalina Robayo of Valle as Miss Colombia 2010. She represented Colombia in Miss Universe 2011 and placed in the Top 16.

Results

 Color keys

  The contestant won in an International pageant.
  The contestant was a Semi-Finalist in an International pageant.
  The contestant did not place.

Special Awards

Scores

Delegates

24 delegates have been selected to compete.

Judges 
The following celebrities judged the final competition:
Ana Raquel Chanis Vannucchi - Panama
Daniel D. Phelan - United States
Jorge Alberto Arguindegui - Argentina
Omar Modesto Pasalodos - Cuba
Paola Dominguín - Spain

References

External links
Official site

Miss Colombia
2010 in Colombia
2010 beauty pageants